The Jamaica Red Cross Society was established in 1948 as a branch of the British Red Cross.

On 2 October 1964, it was recognised as a separate national Red Cross Society organisation.

The Jamaican Red Cross Society is governed and administered a Central Committee. The term of office for its members is two years.

The organisation has executed various programmes to mitigate the negative impact of HIV/AIDS in the country.

References

External links

Official Jamaica Red Cross Website

Organizations established in 1948
Medical and health organisations based in Jamaica
Red Cross and Red Crescent national societies
1948 establishments in Jamaica